Andrei Dmitriyevich Razborov (born 19 November 1994) is a Russian football player. He plays for FC Irtysh Omsk.

Club career
He made his debut in the Russian Football National League for FC Fakel Voronezh on 1 August 2020 in a game against FC Akron Tolyatti, he substituted Mikhail Petrusyov in the 66th minute.

References

External links
 
 Profile by Russian Football National League
 

1994 births
Sportspeople from Omsk
Living people
Russian footballers
Association football forwards
FC Irtysh Omsk players
FC Fakel Voronezh players
FC Chita players
FC Shinnik Yaroslavl players
Russian Second League players
Russian First League players